Maqbool Ahmed (born 9 December 1992) is a Pakistani wicketkeeper-batsman. He plays for Southern Punjab in domestic cricket. He has played a total of 33 first-class, 29 List A and 2 T20 games for Multan, State Bank of Pakistan and Sui Southern Gas Company.

References

1992 births
Living people
Pakistani cricketers
Multan cricketers
State Bank of Pakistan cricketers
Sui Southern Gas Company cricketers
Southern Punjab cricketers
People from Sahiwal
Southern Punjab (Pakistan) cricketers